Ramón Menéndez Pidal (13 March 1869 – 14 November 1968) was a Spanish philologist and historian. He worked extensively on the history of the Spanish language and Spanish folklore and folk poetry. One of his main topics was the history and legend of El Cid. He was nominated for the Nobel Prize in 26 separate years, thus, being the most nominated person.

Biography
Menéndez Pidal was born in A Coruña, Galicia, Spain. His father, Juan Menéndez Fernández, was a lawyer and magistrate from Asturias. His mother was Ramona Pidal, also an Asturian. His older brother, Juan Menéndez Pidal, whom he outlived by more than fifty years, was also a literary scholar of the folk poetry of Asturias. Another older brother, Luis Menéndez Pidal, was a realist painter and professor of art history.

He studied at the University of Madrid. In 1899 he was appointed chair in Romance studies in the same university, a position that he held until his retirement in 1939. In 1900 he married María Goyri, who in 1896 became the first Spanish woman to receive a degree in Philosophy and later, in 1909, became the first woman to attain a non-medical doctorate at a Spanish university. They spent their honeymoon retracing the geographic locales of the Poem of the Cid (Cantar de Mio Cid).

Menéndez Pidal was elected to the Spanish Royal Academy (Real Academia Española) in 1901 and was elected director in 1925. However, he resigned in 1939 under pressure from academics who wanted a director more acceptable to the Franco regime. Nevertheless, in December 1947 he was re-elected director unanimously, and he held the position for the rest of his life.

In 1910, he became the head of the philology section at the Centro de Estudios Históricos (Center for Historical Studies), a division of the liberal and Europe-oriented , which also had sections devoted to medicine, physics, chemistry, and mathematics.

During the 1920s Menéndez Pidal published in rapid succession a series of major studies: Poesía juglaresca y juglares (1924) traced the development of minstrel poetry in medieval Spain. Orígenes del español (1926), a landmark in Romance linguistics, retraces the pre-literary phase of the Ibero-Romance dialects, and the "triumph" of Castilian. A ballad collection, designed for the general public, Flor nueva de romances viejos (1928) became a best seller, and includes some versions of ballads that Menéndez Pidal had authored himself.  Finally, La España del Cid (1929) traced the career of the 11th century warrior lord, Rodrigo Díaz de Vivar ("El Cid"), in a scholarly biography of some 1000 pages.

After the Spanish Civil War, Menéndez Pidal forcibly became an "independent scholar" and revised much of his earlier work.  However, from this period is his sweeping essay "Los españoles en la Historia," a study that traces the struggle between liberals and conservatives in the entire course of Spanish history. He also summarised his findings on the ballads in Romancero Hispánico: Teoría e historia (1953) and applied his theory of the origins of epic poetry to French literature in La Chanson de Roland y el neotradicionalismo (1959).

Menéndez Pidal worked for many years on a comprehensive history of the Spanish language, which he could not complete in his lifetime; the two volumes have been published posthumously as "Historia de la lengua española" (2005).

He was nominated for a Nobel Prize 154 times, but never won. In 1956 alone, he received 95 nominations for the Nobel Prize in Literature.

Major works
 La leyenda de los siete infantes de Lara (1896)
 Crónicas generales de España (1898)
 Manual elemental de Gramática histórica española (1904)
 El dialecto leonés (1906)
 Cantar de mio Cid: texto, gramática y vocabulario (1908–1912)
 Orígenes del español (1926)
 La España del Cid (1929)
 La idea imperial de Carlos V (1938)
 Reliquias de la poesía épica española (1952)
 Romancero hispánico (1953)
 En torno a la lengua vasca (1962), collection of earlier works
 El padre Las Casas: su doble personalidad (1963)

References

External links

 Ramon Menendez Pidal Foundation
 Disputa del alma y el cuerpo y auto de los reyes magos (1900)
 Discursos leídos ante la Real Academia Española (1902)
 Primera crónica general (1906)
 El romancero español (1910)

1869 births
1968 deaths
People from A Coruña
Spanish people of Asturian descent
Romance philologists
Spanish philologists
20th-century Spanish historians
Spanish Roman Catholics
Complutense University of Madrid alumni
Members of the Royal Spanish Academy
Members of the Institute for Catalan Studies
Corresponding Fellows of the Medieval Academy of America
Grand Crosses with Star and Sash of the Order of Merit of the Federal Republic of Germany
Presidents of the Ateneo de Madrid
Corresponding Fellows of the British Academy
Scholars of Al-Andalus history
Spanish folklorists